Birkdale is a Metropolitan Borough of Sefton ward in the Southport Parliamentary constituency that covers the eastern part of the localities of Birkdale and Hillside in the town of Southport, England. The population as at the 2011 census was 13,161.

Councillors
 indicates seat up for re-election.

Election results

Elections of the 2020s

Elections of the 2010s
Changes in vote share are since the seat was previously contested (i.e. 4 years prior), not since the previous local election.

References

Wards of the Metropolitan Borough of Sefton
Southport